Keijō, or Gyeongseong, was an administrative district of Korea under Japanese rule that corresponds to the present Seoul, the capital of South Korea.

Honmachi 

The central district of Gyeongseong was Honmachi, present-day Chungmu-ro.

See also
 History of Seoul
 Names of Seoul

References

Korea under Japanese rule
Former prefectures of Japan in Korea